Jim Curtin (born June 23, 1979) is an American professional soccer coach and former player who is the current head coach of the Philadelphia Union of Major League Soccer. He spent most of his playing career with the Chicago Fire.

Youth and college
Curtin grew up in Oreland, Pennsylvania and played high school soccer at Bishop McDevitt. He excelled in college soccer at Villanova University, being named the Big East Rookie of the Year his freshman year, and taking home first-team All-Big East selections his junior and senior seasons.

Club career

Chicago Fire 

Following graduation, Curtin became the first Wildcat to be drafted by the MLS when he was selected by the Chicago Fire. Perceptions that Curtin was not athletic enough to play professionally, and the relative obscurity of Villanova, led to Curtin not being drafted until the third round of the 2001 MLS SuperDraft.

Curtin made his professional debut against D.C. United at Soldier Field during the second week of the 2001 MLS season. Curtin was named to the starting line-up after starting tandem Diego Gutierrez and Andrew Lewis received straight red cards in the opening match against Columbus Crew. In the same season, the Fire sent Curtin on loan to the Milwaukee Rampage in three early-season games and for the USL A-League playoffs. His rookie year saw 12 starts and registering 1,194 minutes.

From his second season onward, Curtin would anchor a starting spot in the Fire's centerback tandem, started 22 games and played 2,121 minutes. Curtin started every game for the Fire in 2003, playing alongside Carlos Bocanegra and helped the team's defense compensate for Bocanegra's loss in 2004. He would go on to play in more than 200 games for the Fire, which included U.S. Open Cup championships in 2003 and 2006. He was also named 2004 MLS All-Star and the March of Dimes/Comcast Athlete of the Year in 2005.

In 2014, while serving as head coach of the Philadelphia Union, Curtin was ceremonially retired as a Chicago Fire player.

Chivas USA 
On February 7, 2008, one day after his daughter Ryan was born he was traded to Chivas USA for a conditional pick in the 2010 MLS SuperDraft. After two seasons in southern California, Curtin was waived by Chivas USA on January 26, 2010.

Coaching career

Philadelphia Union
After departing Chivas, Curtin returned to the Philadelphia region and began working with the newly formed Philadelphia Union as a coach in the academy system in June 2010. In November 2012, Curtin was named assistant coach for his hometown Philadelphia Union, under John Hackworth and alongside Brendan Burke and Rob Vartughian.

During the 2014 season, Hackworth was fired after a run of poor results with Curtin being named interim coach during the team's search for a permanent replacement. The Union saw a turnaround of form under Curtin, losing only 5 of the remaining 16 matches in the season and advanced to the U.S. Open Cup final, ultimately finishing runners-up to Seattle Sounders in extra time. This success was rewarded on November 7, 2014, the Philadelphia Union announced that Curtin would take the reins as the head coach; removing the "interim" title he had held previously.

The 2015 season still saw the Union struggle during the regular season but made a second consecutive appearance in the U.S. Open Cup final, losing this one to penalty kicks at home to Sporting Kansas City.

Near the end of the 2015 season, the Union fired Nick Sakiewicz as CEO and appoint Earnie Stewart as "Sporting Director" to work with Curtin and address the team's struggles. Initial improvements saw the Union returning to the post-season in 2016 for the first time since the 2011 season. During this season, with a win over rivals New York City FC on April 23, 2016, Curtin set a record five consecutive home wins as well as becoming the highest wins coach in Union history.

The Union were unable to build on their 2016 success, finishing with the same record but still missing the playoffs in 2017. Curtin was announced to retain his head coach position for the 2018 season.

Ahead of the 2019 season, Union Sporting Director, Ernst Tanner, announced that Curtin would be retained for the upcoming season on a one-year extension. By July of that season, the Union reach first place in the Eastern Conference and hitting the club's best start to a season. This success lead to the club announcing Curtin signed a two-year contract extension, to remain head coach through the 2021 season.

The 2020 season was the most successful to date for the Union and Curtin's coaching career. Despite disruptions from the COVID-19 pandemic, the Union reached the semi-final of the MLS is Back Tournament and went on to won their first trophy finishing top of the league standings and earning the 2020 Supporters' Shield. The team's performance over the season earned Curtin his first Sigi Schmid Coach of the Year Award. Winning the Supporter's Shield earned the Union their debut in the CONCACAF Champions League, where the Union earned their first international win against Deportivo Saprissa; a victory that marked Curtin's 100th win as head coach of the club.

Coaching statistics

Honors

Club
Chicago Fire
 Supporters' Shield (1): 2003
 U.S. Open Cup (2): 2003, 2006

Individual
 Big East Rookie of the Year (1): 1997
 All-Big East Selection (2): 1999, 2000
 Philadelphia Soccer Seven Player of the Year (1): 2000
 MLS All-Star (1): 2004
 Chicago Fire Defender of the Year (1): 2004
 Villanova University Hall of Fame: Class of 2017
 MLS Coach of the Year: 2020, 2022

Coaching
Philadelphia Union
 U.S. Open Cup Runner-up (3): 2014, 2015, 2018
 Supporters' Shield (1): 2020

References

External links
 MLS player profile

1979 births
Living people
American soccer players
Association football defenders
Chicago Fire FC draft picks
Chicago Fire FC players
Chivas USA players
Major League Soccer players
Major League Soccer All-Stars
Milwaukee Rampage players
People from Springfield Township, Montgomery County, Pennsylvania
Philadelphia Union coaches
Philadelphia Union non-playing staff
Soccer players from Pennsylvania
A-League (1995–2004) players
Villanova Wildcats men's soccer players
American soccer coaches